Fissurella natalensis is a species of sea snail, a marine gastropod mollusk in the family Fissurellidae, the keyhole limpets.

Description

Distribution
This species occurs in the Indian Ocean off Madagascar, Mozambique and South Africa.

References

 W. & M. Kalk (eds) (1958). A natural history of Inhaca Island, Mozambique. Witwatersrand Univ. Press, Johannesburg. I-iv, 163 pp.
 Kilburn, R.N. & Rippey, E. (1982) Sea Shells of Southern Africa. Macmillan South Africa, Johannesburg, xi + 249 pp. page(s): 36
 Abbott, R.T. & S.P. Dance (1986). Compendium of sea shells. American Malacologists, Inc:Melbourne, Florida
 teyn, D.G. & Lussi, M. (1998) Marine Shells of South Africa. An Illustrated Collector’s Guide to Beached Shells. Ekogilde Publishers, Hartebeespoort, South Africa, ii + 264 pp. page(s): 10

External links
 Branch, G.M. et al. (2002). Two Oceans. 5th impression. David Philip, Cate Town & Johannesburg

Fissurellidae
Gastropods described in 1848
Taxa named by Christian Ferdinand Friedrich Krauss